A by-election was held for the New South Wales Legislative Assembly electorate of Pittwater on 8 February 1975. The election was triggered by the retirement of the Premier Sir Robert Askin.

The Lane Cove by-election was held on the same day.

Dates

Results

Sir Robert Askin resigned.The Labor Party did not contest the election.

See also
Electoral results for the district of Pittwater
List of New South Wales state by-elections

References 

1975 elections in Australia
New South Wales state by-elections
1970s in New South Wales
February 1975 events in Australia